Israel is a country in Western Asia.

Israel may also refer to:

Places 
Land of Israel, the traditional Jewish name for the geographical region between the Mediterranean Sea and the Jordan River
 The Holy Land, a common appellation for roughly the same region due to its theological importance to several Abrahamic religions
 The Promised Land, the land in the southern Levant that was promised by God to Abraham and his descendants (the Hebrews/Israelites) in Judaism and Christianity
Judea/Judaea, occasionally referred to as Israel, as it is known in the Bible in Maccabees, the Gospels, and Acts

Polities 
Kingdom of Israel (disambiguation), which, among the other historical polities of ancient Israel and Judah, may specifically refer to:
Kingdom of Israel (united monarchy), the first Israelite kingdom which united the Twelve Tribes of Israel under a single monarch
Kingdom of Israel (Samaria), the northern Israelite kingdom established after the breakup of the United Monarchy
Kingdom of Judah, the southern Israelite kingdom established after the breakup of the United Monarchy

People
 Israelis, the citizens and nationals of the State of Israel
 Israel (name), a biblical given name and family name
 Jacob, a biblical patriarch who was later given the name of Israel
 Twelve Tribes of Israel, individual tribes descended from the 12 sons of Jacob in the Hebrew Bible
 Israelites, the confederated Twelve Tribes of Israel during the Iron Age
 Jews, an ethnoreligious group originating from the ancient Hebrews/Israelites
 Samaritans, an ethnoreligious group originating from the ancient Hebrews/Israelites

Music
Israel (album), a 1968 studio album by American musicians Kai Winding and J. J. Johnson
"Israel" (Bee Gees song), a 1972 single by the British music group Bee Gees
"Israel" (composition), a 1949 composition by American musician John Carisi
"Israel" (Siouxsie and the Banshees song), a 1980 single by the British rock band Siouxsie and the Banshees
 "Israel", a song by Irving Berlin
 "Israel", a song by British singer Morrissey from his 2017 album Low in High School
 Israel Vibration, a Jamaican reggae group

See also 
 Azrael, the angel of death in Islam and some traditions of Judaism
 The Twelve Tribes (disambiguation)
 Izrael (disambiguation)
 Palestine (disambiguation)